The Busan Cinema Center (also called "Dureraum", meaning enjoying seeing movies all together in Korean) is the official, exclusive venue of the Busan International Film Festival (BIFF), where its opening and closing ceremonies take place, located in Centum City, Busan, South Korea. The about US$150 million (KRW 167.85 billion) center opened on September 29, 2011, almost three years after construction began.  The building won the International Architecture Award and the Chicago Athenaeum in 2007.  , it has the  Guinness World Record for the longest cantilever roof. The center was designed by the Austrian architectural design firm  Coop Himmelb(l)au and constructed by Hanjin Heavy Industries.

Facilities 
The center comprises three buildings (Cine Mountain, Biff Hill, and Double Cone), Biff Theater (an outdoor theater) with the Small Roof, and Dureraum Square with the Big Roof. The Busan Cinema Center, built on a 32,137 m² plot, occupies 54,335 m² of performance, dining, entertainment, and administrative space. The center has two steel roofs. The Big Roof is 163 m long x 60 m wide with an 85 m cantilever portion and weighs 6,376 (metric) tons. The Small Roof covering the outdoor theater BIFF Theater has a span of 70 m and an area of 66 m x 100 to 120 m and weighs 1,236 (metric) tons.  The Big Roof is the longest cantilever roof certified by  Guinness World Records. The ceilings of the Big and Small Roofs are clad with 23,910 and 18,690 LED lights respectively.

References

External links 
 

Haeundae District
Buildings and structures in Busan
Culture of Busan
Tourist attractions in Busan
Theatres in South Korea
Concert halls in South Korea